William Mervyn Stanley Trick (31 October 1916 – ) was a Welsh cricketer who made 19 appearances for Glamorgan between 1946 and 1950. A bowler who could bowl slow left-arm spin and left-arm medium pace, he enjoyed a "prolific record" before and after the Second World War in the South Wales Cricket Association which brought him his place in Glamorgan, and also played occasionally for the school-boy level Wales national football team. He played fewer matches than his abilities - 56 wickets at 19.41 - warranted, due to his dedication to a family motoring business in Neath.

He continued to play club cricket with Neath Cricket Club until well into his seventies

Notes

External links
 

1916 births
1995 deaths
Association footballers not categorized by position
Cricketers from Briton Ferry
Glamorgan cricketers
Welsh cricketers
Welsh footballers